Thomas Krüger (born 20 June 1959) is a German politician. He is the President of the Federal Agency for Civil Education (since 2000) and the President of the German Children's Fund (since 1995). He served as the final Governing Mayor of East Berlin in 1991.

Biography 
Thomas Krüger was born in Buttstädt, East Germany on 20 June 1959. He served on the Bundestag from 1994 to 1998 and was the 7th and final Lord Mayor of East Berlin, serving in 1991. In 2006 he received the Order of Merit of the Federal Republic of Germany. In 2008 he received the Cross of Merit from the Polish Ambassador to Germany at the time, Marek Prawda.

References 

1959 births
Mayors of East Berlin
Members of the Bundestag for Berlin
Members of the Bundestag 1994–1998
People from Buttstädt
Living people
Recipients of the Cross of the Order of Merit of the Federal Republic of Germany